Santa Barbara Point also known as Point Felipe is a cape in Santa Barbara County, California.

References

Landforms of Santa Barbara County, California